The Gannet Islands Ecological Reserve is a remote wildlife refuge in the Labrador Sea.

The Gannet Islands are a group of islands approximately 40 km northeast of Cartwright. The islands are named after the British survey ship HMS Gannet.

The reserve is home to the largest razorbill colony in North America and the third largest breeding colony of Atlantic puffins.

References
http://www.env.gov.nl.ca/env/parks/wer/r_gie/index.html
https://web.archive.org/web/20110225142502/http://www.bsc-eoc.org/iba/site.jsp?siteID=LB001
https://www.flr.gov.nl.ca/natural_areas/wer/r_gie/index.html
https://www.protectedplanet.net/gannet-islands-ecological-reserve-ecological-reserve

Islands of Newfoundland and Labrador
Bird sanctuaries of Canada